Mario Antonio González Martinez (born 20 May 1997) is a Salvadoran professional footballer who plays as a goalkeeper for Primera División club Alianza and the El Salvador national team.

He made his debut for the full El Salvador team against the US Virgin Islands on the 6 June 2021.

References

External links
 

Living people
1997 births
Salvadoran footballers
El Salvador international footballers
Association football goalkeepers
People from San Miguel, El Salvador
C.D. Luis Ángel Firpo footballers
Santa Tecla F.C. footballers
Alianza F.C. footballers
Salvadoran Primera División players
2021 CONCACAF Gold Cup players